Marc Lerandy (born 25 November 1981) is a French-German football manager and former player. He is the manager of Offenburger FV.

Honours
Regionalliga West (IV): 2010

References

External links
 

1984 births
Living people
People from Lahr
German people of Martiniquais  descent
Sportspeople from Freiburg (region)
German footballers
Footballers from Baden-Württemberg
Association football defenders
Germany youth international footballers
SC Freiburg players
SV Sandhausen players
1. FC Saarbrücken players
3. Liga players
SC Pfullendorf players
FK Pirmasens players
Bahlinger SC players
German football managers
Offenburger FV managers